The Belgium class is a series of 8 container ships currently operated by Cosco Shipping Lines and built by Nantong Cosco KHI Ship Engineering in China. The ships have a maximum theoretical capacity of 13,386 TEU.

List of ships

See also 

 COSCO Glory-class container ship

References 

Container ship classes
Ships of COSCO Shipping